Inés Marful (born June 1961, Mieres, Spain) is a Spanish writer from Asturias, known for her works on Federico García Lorca.

Education
Marful studied Spanish literature and philosophy at the University of Oviedo and the University of Valladolid, earning a PhD degree in both fields.  She also studied intercultural coordination at the University of Texas.

Career
Since 1999, Marful has served as a political counselor in the government of Spain and as a photojournalist and columnist.  She is the author of Lorca y sus dobles [Lorca and his doubles], an essay that has been described a "the definitive work on the poet from Granada".  , Marful was serving as the Staff and Media Director in the Department of Environment, Land Planning, Agriculture and Fisheries in the Basque government.

Writings
Marful has written:
 Te sucederá lo que al río en primavera [You will be as the river in springtime] -- winner of the La Voz de Galicia Novel Award
 Instrucciones para olvidar [Instructions to forget]
 Cuatro cuentos de amor y el intocable absurdo [Four tales of love and the untouchable absurd] -- winner of the Casino Mieres Novel Award

References

Spanish women writers
1961 births
Living people
University of Oviedo alumni